Claudia Molitor (born 1974) is an English-German composer based in Brighton, East Sussex, England.

Biography
Born in Germany, Claudia Molitor studied Music and Media at University of Sussex. After an MA in Music at City University London, she completed her PhD in Composition at the University of Southampton in 2004 (her supervisor was Michael Finnissy). She currently lectures in music at City University London.

Work
Molitor can best be described as a conceptual composer. However, she has composed works for more traditional ensembles, such as Apartment House, and for orchestra (awarded a Royal Philharmonic Society Music Award). A fair number of her more recent 'works' are collaborations with composer-performers, such as Lemon Drizzle (a duo she formed with Sarah Nicholls) and site-specific works including Singing Bridge for a walk over Waterloo Bridge from Somerset House to the National Theatre in London, and Sonorama for the train journey between London's St Pancras railway station and Margate.

Molitor is inspired by a wide range of music and composers including Pauline Oliveros, to whom her piece Auricularis Superior (commissioned by Huddersfield Contemporary Music Festival) is dedicated, exploring her idea of Deep Listening.

Scholarships and awards
 Alert (2008), Royal Philharmonic Society

Works (small selection)
 'Paper cut ? a homage to Cage (and Beethoven of course)'
 'Who kissed my head?', for live electronics and acoustic instruments
 'Oh Du Kleines Kabinett', 2006
 'Alert', 2008
 'Untitled [fizzy painting makes me happy]', 2007

References

External links
 Claudia Molitor's official website
 PRS page for CM

1974 births
Living people
English classical composers
20th-century classical composers
21st-century classical composers
Alumni of the University of Southampton
Alumni of City, University of London
Alumni of the University of Sussex
Women classical composers
German women classical composers
20th-century English composers
21st-century English composers
20th-century German composers
20th-century English women musicians
21st-century German composers
21st-century English women musicians
German classical composers
20th-century women composers
21st-century women composers
20th-century German women
21st-century German women